Carinaria lamarckii is a species of sea gastropod, a holoplanktonic marine gastropod mollusk in the family Carinariidae.

Distribution

Description 
The maximum recorded (shell?) length is 115 mm.

Habitat 
Minimum recorded depth is 0 m. Maximum recorded depth is 675 m.

References

External links
 Tree of Life: Carinaria lamarcki
 Marenostrum

Carinariidae
Gastropods described in 1817